Michael Otis Felder (born November 18, 1961) is an American former professional baseball player who played in the major leagues from -. He played for the Milwaukee Brewers, San Francisco Giants, Seattle Mariners and Houston Astros of Major League Baseball (MLB). At just 5-feet 8-inches and a 160 lb. playing weight, the diminutive outfielder was always known in his career as Tiny Felder.

Career
Mike was drafted by the Milwaukee Brewers in the 3rd round of the 1981 Major League Baseball draft.

He was signed as a free agent by the San Francisco Giants on April 5, 1991. He won the 1992 Willie Mac Award honoring his spirit and leadership.

He signed as a free agent by the Seattle Mariners on November 29, 1992.  He was traded by the Seattle Mariners with Mike Hampton to the Houston Astros for Eric Anthony on December 10, 1993.

See also
List of Major League Baseball career stolen bases leaders

References

External links

1962 births
Living people
African-American baseball players
American expatriate baseball players in Canada
Baseball players from California
Bridgeport Bluefish players
Calgary Cannons players
Corpus Christi Barracudas players
Denver Zephyrs players
El Paso Diablos players
Houston Astros players
Major League Baseball left fielders
Milwaukee Brewers players
People from Vallejo, California
San Francisco Giants players
Seattle Mariners players
Stockton Ports players
Tennessee Tomahawks players
Vancouver Canadians players
21st-century African-American people
20th-century African-American sportspeople